Lim Chang-jung (born November 30, 1973) is a South Korean singer-songwriter and actor. He is often referred by Koreans as "the original multi-entertainer" for being active in all three fields: music, film and entertainment. He made his acting debut in 1990 and his singing debut in 1995. Im has since released 17 full-length albums and is known for his hit songs that are vocally challenging to sing. He is the only artist in South Korea who has songs that reached number one on the local music charts in the 1990s, 2000s, and 2010s. He was selected as Singer of the Year and his song "The Love I Committed" was selected as Song of the Year in the surveys conducted by Gallup Korea in 2016.

Personal life
Im married professional golfer Kim Hyun-joo in 2006. The couple, who have three sons together, divorced in 2013. Im married a woman named Seo Ha-yan in 2017. The couple have 2 children together.

On November 9, 2021 it was confirmed that Im had tested positive for COVID-19, and has since halted all promotions for his 17th album Nothing Special With The Day.

Discography

Studio albums

Extended plays

Singles

Album appearances

Soundtrack appearances

Filmography

Film

Television series

Television show

Web shows

Musical theatre

Awards and nominations

As a singer

As an actor

References

External links
 Official website

1973 births
Living people
People from Icheon
South Korean pop singers
South Korean singer-songwriters
Pungcheon Im clan
Melon Music Award winners
South Korean male singer-songwriters
South Korean male film actors
South Korean male television actors
South Korean male singers
South Korean male musical theatre actors
South Korean atheists
Chung-Ang University alumni
Best New Actor Paeksang Arts Award (film) winners